This page gathers the results of elections in Campania.

Regional elections

Latest regional election

In the latest regional election, which took place on 20–21 September 2020, Vincenzo De Luca of the Democratic Party was re-elected President by a landslide 69.5% of the vote.

List of previous regional elections
1970 Campania regional election
1975 Campania regional election
1980 Campania regional election
1985 Campania regional election
1990 Campania regional election
1995 Campania regional election
2000 Campania regional election
2005 Campania regional election
2010 Campania regional election
2020 Campania regional election

References

 
Politics of Campania